The 2010 National Lacrosse League season, the 24th in the history of the NLL, began on January 8, 2010 and ended with the Championship game on May 15.

Team movement
After five seasons in San Jose, the Stealth announced shortly after the 2009 season ended that they would be relocating to Everett, Washington, approximately 30 miles north of Seattle. The Washington Stealth will play at the Comcast Arena.  In addition it was announced on May 4, 2009 that after four seasons in Portland, the Lumberjax would no longer operate in that city and on July 7, 2009 the NLL held a dispersal draft for the Lumberjax players.

On August 10, 2009 it was announced that after three seasons in New York City, the Titans franchise will be relocating to Orlando, Florida, where they will become the Orlando Titans. The franchise will play its home games at Amway Arena.

Standings

Playoffs

Milestones and events

Pre-season
 June 17, 2009: The NLL announced that the San Jose Stealth would be relocating to Everett, Washington, playing at the Comcast Arena.
 June 30, 2009: The NLL announced that George Daniel had been named as Commissioner. Daniel had been Interim Commissioner since Jim Jennings' resignation in January.
 July 7, 2009: A dispersal draft was held for Portland Lumberjax players making the team officially defunct.
 August 10, 2009: The NLL announced that the New York Titans would be moving to Orlando, Florida, becoming the Orlando Titans.

Awards

Annual

All-Pro teams
First Team
 Casey Powell, Orlando
 Josh Sanderson, Calgary
 Dan Dawson, Boston
 Brodie Merrill, Edmonton
 Sandy Chapman, Toronto
 Matt Vinc, Orlando

Second Team
 Colin Doyle, Toronto
 Lewis Ratcliff, Washington
 Rhys Duch, Washington
 Jordan Hall, Orlando
 John Orsen, Orlando
 Anthony Cosmo, Boston

All-Rookie team
 Stephan Leblanc, Toronto
 Garrett Billings, Toronto
 Alex Gajic, Colorado
 Curtis Manning, Calgary
 Matt Beers, Washington
 Chris Corbeil, Buffalo

Weekly awards
The NLL gives out awards weekly for the best overall player, best offensive player, best transition player, best defensive player, and best rookie.

Monthly awards 
Awards are also given out monthly for the best overall player and best rookie.

Statistics leaders
Bold numbers indicate new single-season records. Italics indicate tied single-season records.

See also
 2010 in sports

References

10
National Lacrosse League